"What a Life" is a song recorded by South Korean duo Exo-SC, the second official sub-unit of the South Korean boy group Exo. It was released on July 22, 2019, by SM Entertainment as one of the three title tracks of their first extended play What a Life. The song resulted in Exo-SC first music show win on KBS's Music Bank on August 2, 2019.

Background and release 
"What a Life" is described as a hip hop track with a unique pluck sound and an addictive chorus, and the lyrics contains a pleasant message of "Let's all work and play happily".

On July 31, a cam video of the two members separately of their performance of "What a Life" on their showcase were released.

Music video 
On July 18, a teaser of "What a Life" was released along with the other two title tracks of What a Life EP. On July 21, "What a Life" music video teaser was released. On July 22, the official music video of "What a Life" was released.

Live performance 
Exo-SC performed "What a Life" for the first time on Exo's 5th concert EXO Planet #5 - EXplOration on July 19, and will continue to do so for all the concerts in the tour.

On July 22, EXO-SC performed "What a Life" at their two showcases for the press and for the fans.

Charts

Accolades

Music program awards

Release history

References 

2019 songs
2019 singles
Korean-language songs
SM Entertainment singles
Billboard Korea K-Pop number-one singles